The Demeter TRM-1 Tremulator is a tremolo pedal which has been manufactured by Demeter Amplification since 1982. It was apparently designed at the request of guitarist Ry Cooder, who wanted a pedal that sounded exactly like a vintage Fender tremolo unit for use with any amp.

Controls
The Tremulator has 2 knobs, which are, from left to right: 
"Depth" (controls the amount of amplitude modulation on the signal or the amount of effect)
"Speed" (increases and decreases the frequency of the low-frequency oscillator)
There is also a trim pot on the side to set the bias for the optical unit, and the unit comes preset at Ry Cooder's preferred settings.

Tremulator users
Notable musicians who have used the Tremulator include:

Jonny Greenwood of Radiohead (can be heard on "Bones" and "Lucky")
Nick Valensi of The Strokes (can be heard on "Juicebox")
Eddie Van Halen of Van Halen
Eric Clapton
David Gilmour
Lou Reed
Nels Cline
Sonny Landreth
Ben Harper
Ry Cooder
Tommy Emmanuel
Michael Weiss
Scott McKenzie
Jamie Marshall
Oz Noy
Michael Landau

External links
 The Harmony Central page on the Tremulator
 The Official Demeter Amplification Website

References 

Effects units